Bill Jones (18 March 1923 – April 2003) was a British speed skater. He competed in three events at the 1952 Winter Olympics.

References

1923 births
2003 deaths
British male speed skaters
Olympic speed skaters of Great Britain
Speed skaters at the 1952 Winter Olympics
People from Cannock